Henry Posner III is an American transport executive and investor working in the field of rail transport.

Posner received a bachelor's degree in civil engineering from Princeton University in 1977, and received a Master of Business Administration (MBA) in finance from Wharton School of the University of Pennsylvania.

Personal life
Posner's grandfather Henry Posner Sr. was born in Warsaw, Poland and emigrated to the United States in c.1905, aged seventeen.
Posner's parents Henry Posner Jr. and Helen MacMurdo Posner were married in 1953.
, Posner III continued to live in Pittsburgh, Pennsylvania.

From 1998 onwards, Posner served as a trustee of the Winchester Thurston School, additionally serving as president for four years.

In May 2014, Posner spoke at the International Transport Forum at the need for cooperation as well as competition within rail transport in Europe.

Since 2017, Posner has been an adjunct instructor at Dietrich College of Humanities and Social Sciences Department of History at Carnegie Mellon University (CMU), teaching the course "The American Railroad-Decline and Renaissance in the Era of Deregulation".  In 2021 Posner hired two students from the course to facilitate work on a battery-operated Vivarail D-Train imported from the United Kingdom for the "Pop-up Metro" project.

In mid-2022 the Posner Foundation renewed its yearly grant funding to Operation Lifesaver for work towards increasing safety at level crossings.

References

Living people
1950s births
Year of birth uncertain
Businesspeople from Pittsburgh
American people in rail transportation
Princeton University alumni
Wharton School of the University of Pennsylvania alumni